Mount McKay is a mountain in the Australian Alps region of Australia's Great Dividing Range. Skiing is possible during the winter. Nearby is the Falls Creek Alpine Village.

The summit is the highest drivable point in Australia at 1,848 m.

See also

 Alpine National Park
 List of mountains in Victoria

External links
 Falls Creek Australia: It includes information about Mount McKay

Mackay
Alpine National Park